Qaleh-ye Abbas (also Romanized as Qal‘eh-ye ‘Abbās; also known as Qal‘eh-ye ‘Abbāsī) is a village in Sudlaneh Rural District, in the Central District of Quchan County, Razavi Khorasan Province, Iran. At the 2006 census, its population was 232, in 63 families.

References 

Populated places in Quchan County